SS Edmund Fitzgerald was an American Great Lakes freighter that sank in Lake Superior during a storm on November 10, 1975, with the loss of the entire crew of 29 men. When launched on June 7, 1958, she was the largest ship on North America's Great Lakes, and she remains the largest to have sunk there. She was located in deep water on November 14, 1975, by a U.S. Navy aircraft detecting magnetic anomalies, and found soon afterwards to be in two large pieces.

For 17 years, Edmund Fitzgerald carried taconite iron ore from mines near Duluth, Minnesota, to iron works in Detroit, Michigan; Toledo, Ohio; and other Great Lakes ports. As a workhorse, she set seasonal haul records six times, often breaking her own record. Captain Peter Pulcer was known for piping music day or night over the ship's intercom while passing through the St. Clair and Detroit rivers (between lakes Huron and Erie), and entertaining spectators at the Soo Locks (between Lakes Superior and Huron) with a running commentary about the ship. Her size, record-breaking performance, and "DJ captain" endeared Edmund Fitzgerald to boat watchers.

Carrying a full cargo of ore pellets with Captain Ernest M. McSorley in command, she embarked on her ill-fated voyage from Superior, Wisconsin, near Duluth, on the afternoon of November 9, 1975. En route to a steel mill near Detroit, Edmund Fitzgerald joined a second taconite freighter, . Marie, Michigan, and Sault Ste. Marie, Ontario—a distance Edmund Fitzgerald could have covered in just over an hour at her top speed.

Edmund Fitzgerald previously reported being in significant difficulty to Arthur M. Anderson: "I have a bad list, lost both radars. And am taking heavy seas over the deck. One of the worst seas I've ever been in." However, no distress signals were sent before she sank; Captain McSorley's last (7:10 p.m.) message to Arthur M. Anderson was, "We are holding our own." Her crew of 29 perished, and no bodies were recovered. The exact cause of the sinking remains unknown, though many books, studies, and expeditions have examined it. Edmund Fitzgerald may have been swamped, suffered structural failure or topside damage, grounded on a shoal, or suffered from a combination of these.

The disaster is one of the best known in the history of Great Lakes shipping. Gordon Lightfoot made it the subject of his 1976 hit song "The Wreck of the Edmund Fitzgerald" after reading an article, "The Cruelest Month", in the November 24, 1975, issue of Newsweek. The sinking led to changes in Great Lakes shipping regulations and practices that included mandatory survival suits, depth finders, positioning systems, increased freeboard, and more frequent inspection of vessels.

History

Design and construction
Northwestern Mutual Life Insurance Company of Milwaukee, Wisconsin, invested in the iron and minerals industries on a large scale, including the construction of Edmund Fitzgerald, which represented the first such investment by any American life insurance company. In 1957, they contracted Great Lakes Engineering Works (GLEW), of River Rouge, Michigan, to design and construct the ship "within a foot of the maximum length allowed for passage through the soon-to-be completed Saint Lawrence Seaway." The ship's value at that time was $7 million (equivalent to $ in ). GLEW laid the first keel plate on August 7 the same year.

Edmund Fitzgeralds three central cargo holds were loaded through 21 watertight cargo hatches, each  of  steel. Originally coal-fired, her boilers were converted to burn oil during the 1971–72 winter layup. In 1969, the ship's maneuverability was improved by the installation of a diesel-powered bow thruster.

By ore freighter standards, the interior of Edmund Fitzgerald was luxurious. Her J.L. Hudson Company-designed furnishings included deep pile carpeting, tiled bathrooms, drapes over the portholes, and leather swivel chairs in the guest lounge. There were two guest staterooms for passengers. Air conditioning extended to the crew quarters, which featured more amenities than usual. A large galley and fully stocked pantry supplied meals for two dining rooms. Edmund Fitzgeralds pilothouse was outfitted with "state-of-the-art nautical equipment and a beautiful map room."

Name and launch
Northwestern Mutual wanted to name the ship after its president and chairman of the board, Edmund Fitzgerald. Fitzgerald's own grandfather and all great uncles had themselves been lake captains, and his father owned the Milwaukee Drydock Company, which built and repaired ships. Fitzgerald had attempted to dissuade the naming of the ship after himself, proposing the names Centennial, Seaway, Milwaukee and Northwestern. The board was resolute, and Edmund abstained from voting; the 36 board members voted unanimously to name her the SS Edmund Fitzgerald. More than 15,000 people attended Edmund Fitzgeralds christening and launch ceremony on June 7, 1958. The event was plagued by misfortunes. When Elizabeth Fitzgerald, wife of Edmund Fitzgerald, tried to christen the ship by smashing a champagne bottle over the bow, it took her three attempts to break it. A delay of 36 minutes followed while the shipyard crew struggled to release the keel blocks. Upon sideways launch, the ship created a large wave that "doused" the spectators and then crashed into a pier before righting herself. Other witnesses later said they swore the ship was "trying to climb right out of the water".  On September 22, 1958, Edmund Fitzgerald completed nine days of sea trials.

Career

Northwestern Mutual's normal practice was to purchase ships for operation by other companies. In Edmund Fitzgeralds case, they signed a 25-year contract with Oglebay Norton Corporation to operate the vessel. Oglebay Norton immediately designated Edmund Fitzgerald the flagship of its Columbia Transportation fleet.

Edmund Fitzgerald was a record-setting workhorse, often beating her own milestones. For 17 years, Edmund Fitzgerald carried taconite from Minnesota's Iron Range mines near Duluth, Minnesota, to iron works in Detroit, Toledo, and other ports. She set seasonal haul records six different times. Her nicknames included "Fitz", "Pride of the American Side", "Mighty Fitz", "Toledo Express", "Big Fitz", and the "Titanic of the Great Lakes". Loading Edmund Fitzgerald with taconite pellets took about four and a half hours, while unloading took around 14 hours. A round trip between Superior, Wisconsin, and Detroit, Michigan, usually took her five days and she averaged 47 similar trips per season. The vessel's usual route was between Superior, Wisconsin, and Toledo, Ohio, although her port of destination could vary. By November 1975, Edmund Fitzgerald had logged an estimated 748 round trips on the Great Lakes and covered more than a million miles, "a distance roughly equivalent to 44 trips around the world."

Up until a few weeks before her loss, passengers had traveled on board as company guests. Frederick Stonehouse wrote:

Because of her size, appearance, string of records, and "DJ captain," Edmund Fitzgerald became a favorite of boat watchers throughout her career. Although Captain Peter Pulcer was in command of Edmund Fitzgerald on trips when cargo records were set, "he is best remembered ... for piping music day or night over the ship's intercom system" while passing through the St. Clair and Detroit Rivers. While navigating the Soo Locks he would often come out of the pilothouse and use a bullhorn to entertain tourists with a commentary on details about Edmund Fitzgerald.

In 1969, Edmund Fitzgerald received a safety award for eight years of operation without a time-off worker injury. The vessel ran aground in 1969, and she collided with SS Hochelaga in 1970. Later that same year, she struck the wall of a lock, an accident repeated in 1973 and 1974. During 1974, she lost her original bow anchor in the Detroit River. None of these mishaps, however, were considered serious or unusual. Freshwater ships are built to last more than half a century, and Edmund Fitzgerald would have still had a long career ahead of her when she sank.

Final voyage and wreck

Edmund Fitzgerald left Superior, Wisconsin, at 2:15 p.m. on the afternoon of November 9, 1975, under the command of Captain Ernest M. McSorley. Around 5 p.m., Edmund Fitzgerald joined a second freighter under the command of Captain Jesse B. "Bernie" Cooper, destined for Gary, Indiana, out of Two Harbors, Minnesota. The weather forecast was not unusual for November and the National Weather Service (NWS) predicted that a storm would pass just south of Lake Superior by 7 a.m. on November 10.

SS Wilfred Sykes loaded opposite Edmund Fitzgerald at the Burlington Northern Dock #1 and departed at 4:15 p.m., about two hours after Edmund Fitzgerald. In contrast to the NWS forecast, Captain Dudley J. Paquette of Wilfred Sykes predicted that a major storm would directly cross Lake Superior. From the outset, he chose a route that took advantage of the protection offered by the lake's north shore to avoid the worst effects of the storm. The crew of Wilfred Sykes followed the radio conversations between Edmund Fitzgerald and Arthur M. Anderson during the first part of their trip and overheard their captains deciding to take the regular Lake Carriers' Association downbound route. The NWS altered its forecast at 7:00 p.m., issuing gale warnings for the whole of Lake Superior. Arthur M. Anderson and Edmund Fitzgerald altered course northward, seeking shelter along the Ontario shore, where they encountered a winter storm at 1:00 a.m. on November 10. Captain Paquette of Wilfred Sykes reported that after 1 a.m., he overheard McSorley say that he had reduced the ship's speed because of the rough conditions. Paquette said he was stunned to later hear McSorley, who was not known for turning aside or slowing down, state that "we're going to try for some lee from Isle Royale. You're walking away from us anyway … I can't stay with you."

Until then, Edmund Fitzgerald had followed Arthur M. Anderson, which was travelling at a constant , but the faster Edmund Fitzgerald pulled ahead at about 3:00 a.m. As the storm center passed over the ships, they experienced shifting winds, with wind speeds temporarily dropping as wind direction changed from northeast to south and then northwest.

Shortly after 3:30 p.m., Captain McSorley radioed Arthur M. Anderson to report that Edmund Fitzgerald was taking on water and had lost two vent covers and a fence railing. The vessel had also developed a list. Two of Edmund Fitzgeralds six bilge pumps ran continuously to discharge shipped water. McSorley said that he would slow his ship down so that Arthur M. Anderson could close the gap between them. In a broadcast shortly afterward, the United States Coast Guard (USCG) warned all shipping that the Soo Locks had been closed and they should seek safe anchorage. Shortly after 4:10 p.m., McSorley called Arthur M. Anderson again to report a radar failure and asked Arthur M. Anderson to keep track of them. Edmund Fitzgerald, effectively blind, slowed to let Arthur M. Anderson come within a  range so she could receive radar guidance from the other ship.

For a time, Arthur M. Anderson directed Edmund Fitzgerald toward the relative safety of Whitefish Bay; then, at 4:39 p.m., McSorley contacted the USCG station in Grand Marais, Michigan, to inquire whether the Whitefish Point light and navigation beacon were operational. The USCG replied that their monitoring equipment indicated that both instruments were inactive. McSorley then hailed any ships in the Whitefish Point area to report the state of the navigational aids, receiving an answer from Captain Cedric Woodard of Avafors between 5:00 and 5:30 p.m. that the Whitefish Point light was on but not the radio beacon. Woodard testified to the Marine Board that he overheard McSorley say, "Don't allow nobody on deck," as well as something about a vent that Woodard could not understand. Some time later, McSorley told Woodard, "I have a 'bad list', I have lost both radars, and am taking heavy seas over the deck in one of the worst seas I have ever been in."

At approximately 7:10 p.m., when Arthur M. Anderson notified Edmund Fitzgerald of an upbound ship and asked how she was doing, McSorley reported, "We are holding our own." She was never heard from again. No distress signal was received, and ten minutes later, Arthur M. Anderson lost the ability either to reach Edmund Fitzgerald by radio or to detect her on radar.

Search

Captain Cooper of Arthur M. Anderson first called the USCG in Sault Ste. Marie at 7:39 p.m. on channel 16, the radio distress frequency. The USCG responders instructed him to call back on channel 12 because they wanted to keep their emergency channel open and they were having difficulty with their communication systems, including antennas blown down by the storm. Cooper then contacted the upbound saltwater vessel Nanfri and was told that she could not pick up Edmund Fitzgerald on her radar either. Despite repeated attempts to raise the USCG, Cooper was not successful until 7:54 p.m. when the officer on duty asked him to keep watch for a  boat lost in the area. At about 8:25 p.m., Cooper again called the USCG to express his concern about Edmund Fitzgerald and at 9:03 p.m. reported her missing. Petty Officer Philip Branch later testified, "I considered it serious, but at the time it was not urgent."

Lacking appropriate search-and-rescue vessels to respond to Edmund Fitzgeralds disaster, at approximately 9:00 p.m., the USCG asked Arthur M. Anderson to turn around and look for survivors. Around 10:30 p.m., the USCG asked all commercial vessels anchored in or near Whitefish Bay to assist in the search. The initial search for survivors was carried out by Arthur M. Anderson, and a second freighter, . The efforts of a third freighter, the Toronto-registered , were foiled by the weather. The USCG sent a buoy tender, from Duluth, Minnesota, but it took two and a half hours to launch and a day to travel to the search area. The Traverse City, Michigan, USCG station launched an HU-16 fixed-wing search aircraft that arrived on the scene at 10:53 p.m. while an HH-52 USCG helicopter with a 3.8-million-candlepower searchlight arrived at 1:00 a.m. on November 11. Canadian Coast Guard aircraft joined the three-day search and the Ontario Provincial Police established and maintained a beach patrol all along the eastern shore of Lake Superior.

Although the search recovered debris, including lifeboats and rafts, none of the crew were found. On her final voyage, Edmund Fitzgeralds crew of 29 consisted of the captain; the first, second, and third mates; five engineers; three oilers; a cook; a wiper; two maintenance men; three watchmen; three deckhands; three wheelsmen; two porters; a cadet; and a steward. Most of the crew were from Ohio and Wisconsin; their ages ranged from 20 (watchman Karl A. Peckol) to 63 (Captain McSorley).

Edmund Fitzgerald is among the largest and best-known vessels lost on the Great Lakes, but she is not alone on the Lake Superior seabed in that area. In the years between 1816, when Invincible was lost, and 1975, when Edmund Fitzgerald sank, the Whitefish Point area had claimed at least 240 ships.

Wreck discovery and surveys

Wreck discovery
A U.S. Navy Lockheed P-3 Orion aircraft, piloted by Lt. George Conner and equipped to detect magnetic anomalies usually associated with submarines, found the wreck on November 14, 1975. A further November 14–16 survey by the USCG using a side scan sonar revealed two large objects lying close together on the lake floor. The U.S. Navy also contracted Seaward, Inc., to conduct a second survey between November 22 and 25.

Underwater surveys
In between the two broken sections lay a large mass of taconite pellets and scattered wreckage lying about, including hatch covers and hull plating.

The dive was brief, and although the dive team drew no final conclusions, they speculated that Edmund Fitzgerald had broken up on the surface.

The Michigan Sea Grant Program organized a three-day dive to survey Edmund Fitzgerald in 1989. The primary objective was to record 3-D videotape for use in museum educational programs and the production of documentaries. The expedition used a towed survey system (TSS Mk1) and a self-propelled, tethered, free-swimming remotely operated underwater vehicle (ROV). The Mini Rover ROV was equipped with miniature stereoscopic cameras and wide-angle lenses in order to produce 3-D images. The towed survey system and the Mini Rover ROV were designed, built and operated by Chris Nicholson of Deep Sea Systems International, Inc. Participants included the National Oceanic and Atmospheric Administration (NOAA), the National Geographic Society, the United States Army Corps of Engineers, the Great Lakes Shipwreck Historical Society (GLSHS), and the United States Fish and Wildlife Service, the latter providing RV Grayling as the support vessel for the ROV. The GLSHS used part of the five hours of video footage produced during the dives in a documentary and the National Geographic Society used a segment in a broadcast. Frederick Stonehouse, who wrote one of the first books on the Edmund Fitzgerald wreck, moderated a 1990 panel review of the video that drew no conclusions about the cause of Edmund Fitzgeralds sinking.

Canadian explorer Joseph B. MacInnis organized and led six publicly funded dives to Edmund Fitzgerald over a three-day period in 1994. Harbor Branch Oceanographic Institution provided Edwin A. Link as the support vessel, and their manned submersible, Celia. The GLSHS paid $10,000 for three of its members to each join a dive and take still pictures. MacInnis concluded that the notes and video obtained during the dives did not provide an explanation why Edmund Fitzgerald sank. The same year, longtime sport diver Fred Shannon formed Deepquest Ltd., and organized a privately funded dive to the wreck of Edmund Fitzgerald, using Delta Oceanographic's submersible, Delta. Deepquest Ltd. conducted seven dives and took more than 42 hours of underwater video while Shannon set the record for the longest submersible dive to Edmund Fitzgerald at 211 minutes. Prior to conducting the dives, Shannon studied NOAA navigational charts and found that the international boundary had changed three times before its publication by NOAA in 1976. Shannon determined that based on GPS coordinates from the 1994 Deepquest expedition, "at least one-third of the two acres of immediate wreckage containing the two major portions of the vessel is in U.S. waters because of an error in the position of the U.S.–Canada boundary line shown on official lake charts."

Shannon's group discovered the remains of a crew member partly dressed in coveralls and wearing a life jacket alongside the bow of the ship, indicating that at least one of the crew was aware of the possibility of sinking. The life jacket had deteriorated canvas and "what is thought to be six rectangular cork blocks ... clearly visible." Shannon concluded that "massive and advancing structural failure" caused Edmund Fitzgerald to break apart on the surface and sink.

MacInnis led another series of dives in 1995 to salvage the bell from Edmund Fitzgerald. The Sault Tribe of Chippewa Indians backed the expedition by co-signing a loan in the amount of $250,000. Canadian engineer Phil Nuytten's atmospheric diving suit, known as the "Newtsuit," was used to retrieve the bell from the ship, replace it with a replica, and put a beer can in Edmund Fitzgeralds pilothouse. That same year, Terrence Tysall and Mike Zee set multiple records when they used trimix gas to scuba dive to Edmund Fitzgerald. The pair are the only people known to have touched the Edmund Fitzgerald wreck. They also set records for the deepest scuba dive on the Great Lakes and the deepest shipwreck dive, and were the first divers to reach Edmund Fitzgerald without the aid of a submersible. It took six minutes to reach the wreck, six minutes to survey it, and three hours to resurface to avoid decompression sickness, also known as "the bends."

Restrictions on surveys
Under the Ontario Heritage Act, activities on registered archeological sites require a license. In March 2005, the Whitefish Point Preservation Society accused the Great Lakes Shipwreck Historical Society (GLSHS) of conducting an unauthorized dive to Edmund Fitzgerald. Although the director of the GLSHS admitted to conducting a sonar scan of the wreck in 2002, he denied such a survey required a license at the time it was carried out.

An April 2005 amendment to the Ontario Heritage Act allows the Ontario government to impose a license requirement on dives, the operation of submersibles, side scan sonars or underwater cameras within a designated radius around protected sites. On the basis of the amended law, to protect wreck sites considered "watery graves", the Ontario government issued updated regulations in January 2006, including an area with a  radius around Edmund Fitzgerald and other specifically designated marine archeological sites. In 2009, a further amendment to the Ontario Heritage Act imposed licensing requirements on any type of surveying device.

Hypotheses on the cause of sinking
Extreme weather and sea conditions play a role in all of the published hypotheses regarding Edmund Fitzgeralds sinking, but they differ on the other causal factors.

Waves and weather hypothesis

In 2005, NOAA and the NWS ran a computer simulation, including weather and wave conditions, covering the period from November 9, 1975, until the early morning of November 11. Analysis of the simulation showed that two separate areas of high wind appeared over Lake Superior at 4:00 p.m. on November 10. The southeastern part of the lake, the direction in which Edmund Fitzgerald was heading, had the highest winds. Average wave heights increased to near  by 7:00 p.m., November 10, and winds exceeded  over most of southeastern Lake Superior.

The simulation also showed one in 100 waves reaching  and one out of every 1,000 reaching . Since the ship was heading east-southeastward, it is likely that the waves caused Edmund Fitzgerald to roll heavily.

Rogue wave hypothesis
A group of three rogue waves, often called "three sisters," was reported in the vicinity of Edmund Fitzgerald at the time she sank. The "three sisters" phenomenon is said to occur on Lake Superior as a result of a sequence of three rogue waves forming that are one-third larger than normal waves. The first wave introduces an abnormally large amount of water onto the deck. This water is unable to fully drain away before the second wave strikes, adding to the surplus. The third incoming wave again adds to the two accumulated backwashes, quickly overloading the deck with too much water.

Captain Cooper of Arthur M. Anderson reported that his ship was "hit by two 30 to 35 foot seas about 6:30 p.m., one burying the aft cabins and damaging a lifeboat by pushing it right down onto the saddle. The second wave of this size, perhaps 35 foot, came over the bridge deck." Cooper went on to say that these two waves, possibly followed by a third, continued in the direction of Edmund Fitzgerald and would have struck about the time she sank. This hypothesis postulates that the "three sisters" compounded the twin problems of Edmund Fitzgeralds known list and her lower speed in heavy seas that already allowed water to remain on her deck for longer than usual.

The "Edmund Fitzgerald" episode of the 2010 television series Dive Detectives features the wave-generating tank of the National Research Council's Institute for Naval Technology in St. John's, and the tank's simulation of the effect of a  rogue wave upon a scale model of Edmund Fitzgerald. The simulation indicated such a rogue wave could almost completely submerge the bow or stern of the ship with water, at least temporarily.

Cargo-hold flooding hypothesis
The July 26, 1977, USCG Marine Casualty Report suggested that the accident was caused by ineffective hatch closures. The report concluded that these devices failed to prevent waves from inundating the cargo hold. The flooding occurred gradually and probably imperceptibly throughout the final day, finally resulting in a fatal loss of buoyancy and stability. As a result, Edmund Fitzgerald plummeted to the bottom without warning. Video footage of the wreck site showed that most of her hatch clamps were in perfect condition. The USCG Marine board concluded that the few damaged clamps were probably the only ones fastened. As a result, ineffective hatch closure caused Edmund Fitzgerald to flood and founder.

From the beginning of the USCG inquiry, some of the crewmen's families and various labor organizations believed the USCG findings could be tainted because there were serious questions regarding their preparedness as well as licensing and rules changes. Paul Trimble, a retired USCG vice admiral and president of the Lake Carriers Association (LCA), wrote a letter to the National Transportation Safety Board (NTSB) on September 16, 1977, that included the following statements of objection to the USCG findings:

It was common practice for ore freighters, even in foul weather, to embark with not all cargo clamps locked in place on the hatch covers. Maritime author Wolff reported that depending on weather conditions, all the clamps were eventually set within one to two days. Captain Paquette of Wilfred Sykes was dismissive of suggestions that unlocked hatch clamps caused Edmund Fitzgerald to founder. He said that he commonly sailed in fine weather using the minimum number of clamps necessary to secure the hatch covers.

The May 4, 1978, NTSB findings differed from the USCG. The NTSB made the following observations based on the CURV-III survey:

The NTSB conducted computer studies, testing and analysis to determine the forces necessary to collapse the hatch covers and concluded that Edmund Fitzgerald sank suddenly from flooding of the cargo hold "due to the collapse of one or more of the hatch covers under the weight of giant boarding seas" instead of flooding gradually due to ineffective hatch closures. The NTSB dissenting opinion held that Edmund Fitzgerald sank suddenly and unexpectedly from shoaling.

Shoaling hypothesis
The LCA believed that instead of hatch cover leakage, the more probable cause of Edmund Fitzgeralds loss was shoaling or grounding in the Six Fathom Shoal northwest of Caribou Island when the vessel "unknowingly raked a reef" during the time the Whitefish Point light and radio beacon were not available as navigation aids. This hypothesis was supported by a 1976 Canadian hydrographic survey, which disclosed that an unknown shoal ran a mile farther east of Six Fathom Shoal than shown on the Canadian charts. Officers from Arthur M. Anderson observed that Edmund Fitzgerald sailed through this exact area. Conjecture by proponents of the Six Fathom Shoal hypothesis concluded that Edmund Fitzgeralds downed fence rail reported by McSorley could occur only if the ship "hogged" during shoaling, with the bow and stern bent downward and the midsection raised by the shoal, pulling the railing tight until the cables dislodged or tore under the strain. Divers searched the Six Fathom Shoal after the wreck occurred and found no evidence of "a recent collision or grounding anywhere." Maritime authors Bishop and Stonehouse wrote that the shoaling hypothesis was later challenged on the basis of the higher quality of detail in Shannon's 1994 photography that "explicitly show[s] the devastation of the Edmund Fitzgerald". Shannon's photography of Edmund Fitzgeralds overturned stern showed "no evidence on the bottom of the stern, the propeller or the rudder of the ship that would indicate the ship struck a shoal."

Maritime author Stonehouse reasoned that "unlike the Lake Carriers, the Coast Guard had no vested interest in the outcome of their investigation." Author Bishop reported that Captain Paquette of Wilfred Sykes argued that through their support for the shoaling explanation, the LCA represented the shipping company's interests by advocating a hypothesis that held LCA member companies, the American Bureau of Shipping, and the U.S. Coast Guard Service blameless.

Paul Hainault, a retired professor of mechanical engineering from Michigan Technological University, promoted a hypothesis that began as a student class project. His hypothesis held that Edmund Fitzgerald grounded at 9:30 a.m. on November 10 on Superior Shoal. Discovery of the shoal resulted in a change in recommended shipping routes. A seiche, or standing wave, that occurred during the low-pressure system over Lake Superior on November 10, 1975, caused the lake to rise  over the Soo Locks's gates to flood Portage Avenue in Sault Ste. Hainault's hypothesis held that this seiche contributed to Edmund Fitzgerald shoaling  of her hull on Superior Shoal, causing the hull to be punctured mid-body. The hypothesis contended that the wave action continued to damage the hull, until the middle third dropped out like a box, leaving the ship held together by the center deck. The stern section acted as an anchor and caused Edmund Fitzgerald to come to a full stop, causing everything to go forward. The ship broke apart on the surface within seconds. Compressed air pressure blew a hole in the starboard bow, which sank 18 degrees off course. The rear kept going forward with the engine still running, rolled to port and landed bottom up.

Structural failure hypothesis
Another published hypothesis contends that an already weakened structure, and modification of Edmund Fitzgeralds winter load line (which allows heavier loading and travel lower in the water), made it possible for large waves to cause a stress fracture in the hull. This is based on the "regular" huge waves of the storm and does not necessarily involve rogue waves.

The NTSB came to the same conclusion as USCG because:

After maritime historian Frederick Stonehouse moderated the panel reviewing the video footage from the 1989 ROV survey of Edmund Fitzgerald, he concluded that the extent of taconite coverage over the wreck site showed that the stern had floated on the surface for a short time and spilled taconite into the forward section; thus the two sections of the wreck did not sink at the same time. He said:

The stress fracture hypothesis was supported by the testimony of former crewmen. Former Second Mate Richard Orgel, who served on Edmund Fitzgerald in 1972 and 1973, testified that "the ship had a tendency to bend and spring during storms 'like a diving board after somebody has jumped off. Orgel was quoted as saying that the loss of Edmund Fitzgerald was caused by hull failure, "pure and simple. I detected undue stress in the side tunnels by examining the white enamel paint, which will crack and splinter when submitted to severe stress." George H. "Red" Burgner, Edmund Fitzgeralds steward for ten seasons and winter ship-keeper for seven years, testified in a deposition that a "loose keel" contributed to the vessel's loss. Burgner further testified that "the keel and sister kelsons were only 'tack welded'" and that he had personally observed that many of the welds were broken. Burgner was not asked to testify before the Marine Board of Inquiry.

When Bethlehem Steel Corporation permanently laid up Edmund Fitzgeralds sister ship, SS Arthur B. Homer, just five years after going to considerable expense to lengthen her, questions were raised as to whether both ships had the same structural problems. The two vessels were built in the same shipyard using welded joints instead of the riveted joints used in older ore freighters. Riveted joints allow a ship to flex and work in heavy seas, while welded joints are more likely to break. Reports indicate that repairs to Edmund Fitzgeralds hull were delayed in 1975 due to plans to lengthen the ship during the upcoming winter layup. In 1978, without explanation, Bethlehem Steel Corporation denied permission for the chairman of the NTSB to travel on Arthur B. Homer. Arthur B. Homer was permanently laid up in 1980 and broken for scrap in 1987.

Retired GLEW naval architect Raymond Ramsay, one of the members of the design team that worked on the hull of Edmund Fitzgerald, reviewed her increased load lines, maintenance history, along with the history of long ship hull failure and concluded that Edmund Fitzgerald was not seaworthy on November 10, 1975. He stated that planning Edmund Fitzgerald to be compatible with the constraints of the St. Lawrence Seaway had placed her hull design in a "." Edmund Fitzgeralds long-ship design was developed without the benefit of research, development, test, and evaluation principles while computerized analytical technology was not available at the time she was built. Ramsay noted that Edmund Fitzgeralds hull was built with an all-welded (instead of riveted) modular fabrication method, which was used for the first time in the GLEW shipyard. Ramsay concluded that increasing the hull length to  resulted in an L/D slenderness ratio (the ratio of the length of the ship to the depth of her structure) that caused excessive multi-axial bending and springing of the hull, and that the hull should have been structurally reinforced to cope with her increased length.

Topside damage hypothesis
The USCG cited topside damage as a reasonable alternative reason for Edmund Fitzgerald sinking and surmised that damage to the fence rail and vents was possibly caused by a heavy floating object such as a log. Historian and mariner Mark Thompson believes that something broke loose from Edmund Fitzgeralds deck. He theorized that the loss of the vents resulted in flooding of two ballast tanks or a ballast tank and a walking tunnel that caused the ship to list. Thompson further conjectured that damage more extensive than Captain McSorley could detect in the pilothouse let water flood the cargo hold. He concluded that the topside damage Edmund Fitzgerald experienced at 3:30 p.m. on November 10, compounded by the heavy seas, was the most obvious explanation for why she sank.

Possible contributing factors
The USCG, NTSB, and proponents of alternative theories have all named multiple possible contributing factors to the foundering of Edmund Fitzgerald.

Weather forecasting

The NWS long-range forecast on November 9, 1975, predicted that a storm would pass just south of Lake Superior and over the Keweenaw Peninsula, extending into the Lake from Michigan's Upper Peninsula. Captain Paquette of Wilfred Sykes had been following and charting the low-pressure system over Oklahoma since November 8 and concluded that a major storm would track across eastern Lake Superior. He therefore chose a route that gave Wilfred Sykes the most protection and took refuge in Thunder Bay, Ontario, during the worst of the storm. Based on the NWS forecast, Arthur M. Anderson and Edmund Fitzgerald instead started their trip across Lake Superior following the regular Lake Carriers Association route, which placed them in the path of the storm. The NTSB investigation concluded that the NWS failed to accurately predict wave heights on November 10. After running computer models in 2005 using actual meteorological data from November 10, 1975, Hultquist of the NWS said of Edmund Fitzgeralds position in the storm, "It ended in precisely the wrong place at the absolute worst time."

Inaccurate navigational charts
After reviewing testimony that Edmund Fitzgerald had passed near shoals north of Caribou Island, the USCG Marine Board examined the relevant navigational charts. They found that the Canadian 1973 navigational chart for the Six Fathom Shoal area was based on Canadian surveys from 1916 and 1919 and that the 1973 U.S. Lake Survey Chart No. 9 included the notation, "Canadian Areas. For data concerning Canadian areas, Canadian authorities have been consulted." Thereafter, at the request of the Marine Board and the Commander of the USCG Ninth District, the Canadian Hydrographic Service conducted a survey of the area surrounding Michipicoten Island and Caribou Island in 1976. The survey revealed that the shoal ran about  farther east than shown on Canadian charts. The NTSB investigation concluded that, at the time of Edmund Fitzgeralds foundering, Lake Survey Chart No. 9 was not detailed enough to indicate Six Fathom Shoal as a hazard to navigation.

Lack of watertight bulkheads
Mark Thompson, a merchant seaman and author of numerous books on Great Lakes shipping, stated that if her cargo holds had watertight subdivisions, "the Edmund Fitzgerald could have made it into Whitefish Bay." Frederick Stonehouse also held that the lack of watertight bulkheads caused Edmund Fitzgerald to sink. He said:

Stonehouse called on ship designers and builders to design lake carriers more like ships rather than "motorized super-barges" making the following comparison:

After Edmund Fitzgerald foundered, Great Lakes shipping companies were accused of valuing cargo payloads more than human life, since the vessel's cargo hold of  had been divided by two non-watertight traverse "screen" bulkheads. The NTSB Edmund Fitzgerald investigation concluded that Great Lakes freighters should be constructed with watertight bulkheads in their cargo holds.

The USCG had proposed rules for watertight bulkheads in Great Lakes vessels as early as the sinking of Daniel J. Morrell in 1966 and did so again after the sinking of Edmund Fitzgerald, arguing that this would allow ships to make it to refuge or at least allow crew members to abandon ship in an orderly fashion. The LCA represented the Great Lakes fleet owners and was able to forestall watertight subdivision regulations by arguing that this would cause economic hardship for vessel operators. A few vessel operators have built Great Lakes ships with watertight subdivisions in the cargo holds since 1975, but most vessels operating on the lakes cannot prevent flooding of the entire cargo hold area.

Lack of instrumentation
A fathometer was not required under USCG regulations, and Edmund Fitzgerald lacked one, even though fathometers were available at the time of her sinking. Instead, a hand line was the only method Edmund Fitzgerald had to take depth soundings. The hand line consisted of a piece of line knotted at measured intervals with a lead weight on the end. The line was thrown over the bow of the ship and the count of the knots measured the water depth. The NTSB investigation concluded that a fathometer would have provided Edmund Fitzgerald additional navigational data and made her less dependent on Arthur M. Anderson for navigational assistance.

Edmund Fitzgerald had no system to monitor the presence or amount of water in her cargo hold, even though there was always some present. The intensity of the November 10 storm would have made it difficult, if not impossible, to access the hatches from the spar deck (deck over the cargo holds). The USCG Marine Board found that flooding of the hold could not have been assessed until the water reached the top of the taconite cargo. The NTSB investigation concluded that it would have been impossible to pump water from the hold when it was filled with bulk cargo. The Marine Board noted that because Edmund Fitzgerald lacked a draft-reading system, the crew had no way to determine whether the vessel had lost freeboard (the level of a ship's deck above the water).

Increased load lines, reduced freeboard
The USCG increased Edmund Fitzgeralds load line in 1969, 1971, and 1973 to allow  less minimum freeboard than Edmund Fitzgeralds original design allowed in 1958. Captain Paquette of Wilfred Sykes noted that this change allowed loading to 4,000 tons more than what Edmund Fitzgerald was designed to carry.

Concerns regarding Edmund Fitzgeralds keel-welding problem surfaced during the time the USCG started increasing her load line. This increase and the resultant reduction in freeboard decreased the vessel's critical reserve buoyancy. Prior to the load-line increases she was said to be a "good riding ship" but afterwards Edmund Fitzgerald became a sluggish ship with slower response and recovery times. Captain McSorley said he did not like the action of a ship he described as a "wiggling thing" that scared him. Edmund Fitzgeralds bow hooked to one side or the other in heavy seas without recovering and made a groaning sound not heard on other ships.

Maintenance
NTSB investigators noted that Edmund Fitzgeralds prior groundings could have caused undetected damage that led to major structural failure during the storm, since Great Lakes vessels were normally drydocked for inspection only once every five years. It was also alleged that when compared to Edmund Fitzgeralds previous captain (Peter Pulcer), McSorley did not keep up with routine maintenance and did not confront the mates about getting the requisite work done. After August B. Herbel Jr., president of the American Society for Testing and Materials, examined photographs of the welds on Edmund Fitzgerald, he stated, "the hull was just being held together with patching plates." Other questions were raised as to why the USCG did not discover and take corrective action in its pre-November 1975 inspection of Edmund Fitzgerald, given that her hatch coamings, gaskets, and clamps were poorly maintained.

Complacency
On the fateful evening of November 10, 1975, McSorley reported he had never seen bigger seas in his life. Paquette, master of Wilfred Sykes, out in the same storm, said, "I'll tell anyone that it was a monster sea washing solid water over the deck of every vessel out there." The USCG did not broadcast that all ships should seek safe anchorage until after 3:35 p.m. on November 10, many hours after the weather was upgraded from a gale to a storm.

McSorley was known as a "heavy weather captain" who beat hell' out of the Edmund Fitzgerald and 'very seldom ever hauled up for weather. Paquette held the opinion that negligence caused Edmund Fitzgerald to founder. He said, "in my opinion, all the subsequent events arose because (McSorley) kept pushing that ship and didn't have enough training in weather forecasting to use common sense and pick a route out of the worst of the wind and seas." Paquette's vessel was the first to reach a discharge port after the November 10 storm; she was met by company attorneys who came aboard Sykes. He told them that Edmund Fitzgeralds foundering was caused by negligence. Paquette was never asked to testify during the USCG or NTSB investigations.

The NTSB investigation noted that Great Lakes cargo vessels could normally avoid severe storms and called for the establishment of a limiting sea state applicable to Great Lakes bulk cargo vessels. This would restrict the operation of vessels in sea states above the limiting value. One concern was that shipping companies pressured the captains to deliver cargo as quickly and cheaply as possible regardless of bad weather. At the time of Edmund Fitzgeralds foundering, there was no evidence that any governmental regulatory agency tried to control vessel movement in foul weather despite the historical record that hundreds of Great Lakes vessels had been wrecked in storms. The USCG took the position that only the captain could decide when it was safe to sail.

The USCG Marine Board issued the following conclusion:

Mark Thompson countered that "the Coast Guard laid bare [its] own complacency" by blaming the sinking of Edmund Fitzgerald on industry-wide complacency since it had inspected Edmund Fitzgerald just two weeks before she sank. The loss of Edmund Fitzgerald also exposed the USCG's lack of rescue capability on Lake Superior. Thompson said that ongoing budget cuts had limited the USCG's ability to perform its historical functions. He further noted that USCG rescue vessels were unlikely to reach the scene of an incident on Lake Superior or Lake Huron within 6 to 12 hours of its occurrence.

Legal settlement
Under maritime law, ships fall under the jurisdiction of the admiralty courts of their flag country. As Edmund Fitzgerald was sailing under the U.S. flag, even though she sank in foreign (Canadian) waters, she was subject to U.S. admiralty law. With a value of $24 million, Edmund Fitzgeralds financial loss was the greatest in Great Lakes sailing history. In addition to the crew,  of taconite sank along with the vessel. Two widows of crewmen filed a $1.5 million lawsuit against Edmund Fitzgeralds owners, Northwestern Mutual, and its operators, Oglebay Norton Corporation, one week after she sank. An additional $2.1 million lawsuit was later filed. Oglebay Norton subsequently filed a petition in the U.S. District Court seeking to "limit their liability to $817,920 in connection with other suits filed by families of crew members." The company paid compensation to surviving families about 12 months in advance of official findings of the probable cause and on condition of imposed confidentiality agreements. Robert Hemming, a reporter and newspaper editor, reasoned in his book about Edmund Fitzgerald that the USCG's conclusions "were benign in placing blame on [n]either the company or the captain ... [and] saved the Oglebay Norton from very expensive lawsuits by the families of the lost crew."

Subsequent changes to Great Lakes shipping practice
The USCG investigation of Edmund Fitzgeralds sinking resulted in 15 recommendations regarding load lines, weathertight integrity, search and rescue capability, lifesaving equipment, crew training, loading manuals, and providing information to masters of Great Lakes vessels. NTSB's investigation resulted in 19 recommendations for the USCG, four recommendations for the American Bureau of Shipping, and two recommendations for NOAA. Of the official recommendations, the following actions and USCG regulations were put in place:
1. In 1977, the USCG made it a requirement that all vessels of 1,600 gross register tons and over use depth finders.
2. Since 1980, survival suits have been required aboard ship in each crew member's quarters and at their customary work station with strobe lights affixed to life jackets and survival suits.
3. A LORAN-C positioning system for navigation on the Great Lakes was implemented in 1980 and later replaced with Global Positioning System (GPS) in the 1990s.
4. Emergency Position Indicating Radio Beacons (EPIRBs) are installed on all Great Lakes vessels for immediate and accurate location in event of a disaster.
5. Navigational charts for northeastern Lake Superior were improved for accuracy and greater detail.
6. NOAA revised its method for predicting wave heights.
7. The USCG rescinded the 1973 Load Line Regulation amendment that permitted reduced freeboard loadings.
8. The USCG began the annual pre-November inspection program recommended by the NTSB. "Coast Guard inspectors now board all U.S. ships during the fall to inspect hatch and vent closures and lifesaving equipment."

Karl Bohnak, an Upper Peninsula meteorologist, covered the sinking and storm in a book on local weather history. In this book, Joe Warren, a deckhand on Arthur M. Anderson during the November 10, 1975, storm, said that the storm changed the way things were done. He stated, "After that, trust me, when a gale came up we dropped the hook [anchor]. We dropped the hook because they found out the big ones could sink." Mark Thompson wrote, "Since the loss of the Fitz, some captains may be more prone to go to anchor, rather than venturing out in a severe storm, but there are still too many who like to portray themselves as 'heavy weather sailors.'"

Memorials

The day after the wreck, Mariners' Church in Detroit rang its bell 29 times; once for each life lost. The church continued to hold an annual memorial, reading the names of the crewmen and ringing the church bell, until 2006 when the church broadened its memorial ceremony to commemorate all lives lost on the Great Lakes.

The ship's bell was recovered from the wreck on July 4, 1995. A replica engraved with the names of the 29 sailors who died replaced the original on the wreck. A legal document signed by 46 relatives of the deceased, officials of the Mariners' Church of Detroit and the Great Lakes Shipwreck Historic Society (GLSHS) "donated the custodian and conservatorship" of the bell to the GLSHS "to be incorporated in a permanent memorial at Whitefish Point, Michigan, to honor the memory of the 29 men of the SS Edmund Fitzgerald." The terms of the legal agreement made the GLSHS responsible for maintaining the bell, and forbade it from selling or moving the bell or using it for commercial purposes. It provided for transferring the bell to the Mariners' Church of Detroit if the terms were violated.

An uproar occurred in 1995 when a maintenance worker in St. Ignace, Michigan, refurbished the bell by stripping the protective coating applied by Michigan State University experts. The controversy continued when the Great Lakes Shipwreck Museum tried to use the bell as a touring exhibit in 1996. Relatives of the crew halted this move, objecting that the bell was being used as a "traveling trophy." , the bell is on display in the Great Lakes Shipwreck Museum in Whitefish Point near Paradise, Michigan.

An anchor from Edmund Fitzgerald lost on an earlier trip was recovered from the Detroit River and is on display at the Dossin Great Lakes Museum in Detroit, Michigan. The Dossin Great Lakes Museum also hosts a Lost Mariners Remembrance event each year on the evening of November 10. Artifacts on display in the Steamship Valley Camp museum in Sault Ste. Marie, include two lifeboats, photos, a movie of Edmund Fitzgerald and commemorative models and paintings. Every November 10, the Split Rock Lighthouse near Silver Bay, Minnesota, emits a light in honor of Edmund Fitzgerald.

On August 8, 2007, along a remote shore of Lake Superior on the Keweenaw Peninsula, a Michigan family discovered a lone life-saving ring that appeared to have come from Edmund Fitzgerald. It bore markings different from those of rings found at the wreck site, and was thought to be a hoax. Later it was determined that the life ring was not from Edmund Fitzgerald, but had been lost by the owner, whose father had made it as a personal memorial.

The Royal Canadian Mint commemorated Edmund Fitzgerald in 2015 with a colored silver collector coin, with a face value of $20.

Musical and theater tributes
In 1976, Ontario singer-songwriter Gordon Lightfoot wrote, composed, and recorded the song "The Wreck of the Edmund Fitzgerald" for his album Summertime Dream. On NPR's Weekend Edition Saturday on February 14, 2015, Gordon Lightfoot said he was inspired to write the song when he saw the name misspelled "Edmond" in Newsweek magazine two weeks after the sinking; Lightfoot said he felt that it dishonored the memory of the 29 who died. Lightfoot's popular ballad made the sinking of Edmund Fitzgerald one of the best-known disasters in the history of Great Lakes shipping. The original lyrics of the song show a degree of artistic license compared to the events of the actual sinking: it states the destination as Cleveland instead of Detroit. Also, in light of new evidence about what happened, Lightfoot has modified one line for live performances, the original stanza being:

Lightfoot changed the third line to "At 7 p.m. it grew dark, it was then".

In 1986, writer Steven Dietz and songwriter/lyricist Eric Peltoniemi wrote the musical Ten November in memory of Edmund Fitzgeralds sinking. In 2005, the play was re-edited into a concert version called The Gales of November, which opened on the 30th anniversary of the sinking at the Fitzgerald Theater in St. Paul, Minnesota.

A piano concerto titled The Edmund Fitzgerald was composed by American composer Geoffrey Peterson in 2002; it premiered by the Sault Symphony Orchestra in Sault Ste. Marie, Ontario, in November 2005 as another 30th-anniversary commemoration.

Commercialization
The fame of Edmund Fitzgeralds image and historical narrative have made it public domain and subject to commercialization. A "cottage industry" has evolved across the Great Lakes region from Two Harbors, Minnesota, to Whitefish Point, the incident's "ground zero". Memorabilia on sale include Christmas ornaments, T-shirts, coffee mugs, Edmund Fitzgerald Porter, videos, and other items commemorating the vessel and its loss.

See also

 List of maritime disasters
 List of shipwrecks in the Great Lakes
 List of storms on the Great Lakes
 MV Derbyshire, a British bulk carrier lost in 1980 under similar circumstances

Notes

References

Bibliography

External links

   from Telescope magazine
 Image gallery I and Image gallery II of the SS Edmund Fitzgerald from Thunder Bay National Marine Sanctuary collection
 Images of the Edmund Fitzgerald from the Minnesota Historical Society
 The sinking of the SS Edmund Fitzgerald, November 10, 1975, from the University of Wisconsin
 Yesterday's news, November 10, 1975: Edmund Fitzgerald reported missing from the Minneapolis Star Tribune

1958 ships
Great Lakes freighters
Maritime incidents in 1975
Merchant ships of the United States
November 1975 events in North America
Queen of the Lakes
Rogue wave incidents
Ships built in River Rouge, Michigan
Ships lost with all hands
Shipwrecks of Lake Superior